Agustina Solano García Tejera (born 5 April 1995) is an Argentine-born Chilean field hockey player.

Solano made her junior debut at the 2016 Women's Pan-Am Junior Championship, where the team won a bronze medal. From this tournament, the team qualified for the 2016 Women's Hockey Junior World Cup, where Solano also represented Chile.

Solano made her international debut for the Chile senior team at the 2016-17 Hockey World League Semifinal in Johannesburg, South Africa. 

Solano was part of the Chile team at the 2017 Women's Pan American Cup. At the tournament, the team recorded a historic 4–3 victory over the United States.

References

External links 
 Agustina Solano at the 2019 Pan American Games

1995 births
Living people
Chilean female field hockey players
South American Games gold medalists for Chile
South American Games bronze medalists for Chile
South American Games medalists in field hockey
Competitors at the 2018 South American Games
Competitors at the 2022 South American Games
Pan American Games competitors for Chile
Field hockey players at the 2019 Pan American Games
Naturalized citizens of Chile